Mossman may refer to:

Places
 Mossman, Queensland, Australia
 Mossman Central Mill
 Mossman Gorge, Queensland
 Mossman River, Queensland
 Mossman Inlet, Antarctica
 Mossman Peninsula, Antarctica

People
 Mossman (surname)

Other uses
 Mossman Collection, a collection of horse-drawn vehicles in the UK
 Mossman v. Higginson, an 1800 United States Supreme Court decision

See also
 Mosman (disambiguation)